Quick Boys is an amateur football club from Katwijk aan Zee, Netherlands. The club, established on February 1, 1920, is the second most successful amateur football club in the Netherlands, behind IJsselmeervogels.

The club joined the football competition in 1921–22, in the Leidsche Voetbal Bond (LVB), the football association for Leiden. The club played in the Sunday league but a ban on entry charges on Sunday caused financial troubles and Quick Boys moved to the new Saturday league. 

Quick Boys have played at the highest amateur level since the founding of the club in 1920. The club won 9 titles in the Eerste Klasse, and joined the new Saturday Hoofdklasse in 1996, winning a further four titles. Twenty seasons later they won promotion to the Derde Divisie (formerly Topklasse) for the first time by winning the fourth Hoofdklasse title. After three seasons in the Derde Divisie, Quick Boys promoted to the highest amateur division (Tweede Divisie) after beating OSS '20 and VVSB in the relegation play-offs. 

The club reached the quarter-finals of the 2007–08 KNVB Cup.

Former professional footballer Dirk Kuyt started and ended his senior career with the team, playing in 1998 and 2018.

Current squad

Honours
The structure of the Hoofdklasse allows Quick Boys three title opportunities in one season: the regular division, the Saturday title and the national title. The overall Saturday title is contested between the champions of the three Saturday divisions, and the national title is contested between the Saturday champion and the Sunday champion. Since 2016, the Hoofdklasse has two divisions for both Saturday and Sunday.

Division title of the highest amateur league: 11
1945–46, 1952–53, 1954–55, 1955–56, 1957–58, 1959–60, 1961–62, 1990–91, 1991–92, 2002–03, 2003–04
Division title of the second highest amateur league: 2
2010–11, 2015–16
National Saturday amateur football title: 9
1945–46, 1952–53, 1957–58, 1959–60, 1961–62, 1990–91, 1991–92, 2003–04, 2015–16
National amateur football title: 2
1991–92, 2003–04
KNVB Amateur Cup: 1
1951–52

External links
Official website

Quick Boys
Football clubs in the Netherlands
Football clubs in Katwijk
Association football clubs established in 1920
1920 establishments in the Netherlands